Ralf Aron (born 21 March 1998) is an Estonian former racing driver, who competed in the Italian F4 Championship, ADAC Formula 4 and European Formula 3 championships for Prema Powerteam and Hitech GP.

He is now a team manager at Prema, but continues to race sporadically – winning the Palanga 1000 GT race three times and also raced in the Porsche Sprint Challenge NEZ.

Karting record

Karting career summary

Racing record

Career summary

Complete Formula Renault 1.6 NEC results 
(key) (Races in bold indicate pole position) (Races in italics indicate fastest lap)

Complete Italian F4 Championship results 
(key) (Races in bold indicate pole position) (Races in italics indicate fastest lap)

Complete FIA Formula 3 European Championship results
(key) (Races in bold indicate pole position) (Races in italics indicate fastest lap)

† Driver did not finish the race, but was classified as he completed over 90% of the race distance.
‡ Half points awarded as less than 75% of race distance was completed.

Complete Macau Grand Prix results

Personal
His younger brother Paul is also a racing driver.

References

External links
 

1998 births
Living people
Estonian racing drivers
Italian F4 Championship drivers
Italian F4 champions
ADAC Formula 4 drivers
FIA Formula 3 European Championship drivers
MRF Challenge Formula 2000 Championship drivers
Prema Powerteam drivers
Karting World Championship drivers
Van Amersfoort Racing drivers
Hitech Grand Prix drivers